These are the films shown at the 8th New York Underground Film Festival, held from March 7–13, 2001.

External links
 New York Underground Film Festival site
 2001 Festival Archive

New York Underground Film Festival
Underground Film Festival
2001 film festivals
New York Underground Film
2001 in American cinema